Cornwall/Devon League (known as Tribute Cornwall/Devon League for sponsorship reasons) was an English level eight, rugby union league for clubs principally based in Cornwall and Devon. Following the reorganisation of the English rugby union leagues in 2022, the league was replaced by two level eight leagues based in Cornwall and Devon. The Pirates Amateurs won the last competition in season 2021–22 and were promoted to Counties 1 Western West

Format
The champions and runner-up were promoted to Western Counties West. The number of teams relegated depends on feedback following promotion and relegation in the leagues above, but was usually two or three to Cornwall 1 and/or Devon 1. The season ran from September to April and comprised twenty-six rounds of matches, with each club playing each of its rivals, home and away. The results of the matches contributed points to the league as follows:
 4 points are awarded for a win
 2 points are awarded for a draw
 0 points are awarded for a loss, however
 1 losing (bonus) point is awarded to a team that loses a match by 7 points or fewer
 1 additional (bonus) point is awarded to a team scoring 4 tries or more in a match.
The top two teams are promoted to Western Counties West and the bottom three teams are relegated to either Cornwall 1 or Devon 1 depending on their location.

2021–22
The 2021–22 Cornwall/Devon League consisted of fourteen teams; eight from Devon and six from Cornwall. The season started on 4 September 2021 and the final matches were played on 23 April 2022. Nine of the fourteen teams participated in the previous, completed season (2019–20); which following the withdrawal of Lanner in February 2020 only had thirteen teams. Truro and Paignton were promoted to Western Counties West as champions and runner-up respectively while South Molton and Exeter Athletic were relegated to Devon 1.

Five of the fourteen teams from the 2021–22 competition were promoted to the level seven Counties 1 Western West for the 2022–23 season; Pirates Amateurs, Topsham, Cullompton, Bude and Plymstock Albion Oaks. Five teams were assigned to the level eight league Counties 2 Cornwall; Hayle, Liskead-Looe, Newquay Hornets, Saltash and Veor while four teams were assigned to the level eight league Counties 2 Devon; North Tawton, Tavistock, Torquay Athletic and Withycombe. No teams were relegated to level nine.

Participating teams and locations

League table

2020–21
Due to the COVID-19 pandemic, the 2020–21 season was cancelled.

2019–20

Participating teams and locations

League table

2018–19

Participating teams and locations

Final league table

2017–18
The season started on 2 September 2017 and finished on 21 April 2018. Fourteen teams contested the Cornwall/Devon league, seven from Devon, six from Cornwall and one from Somerset (Wellington). Nine of the sides played in the league last season and are joined by Bude (13th) and Wellington (14th), both relegated from Western Counties West, and three sides promoted from Devon 1 and Cornwall 1. Wessex (from Devon 1) and Hayle (Cornwall 1) are champions of their respective leagues and Torrington were also promoted after Newquay Hornets declined to contest a play-off for the third promotion match.

Participating teams and locations

Final league table

2016–17
A total of fourteen teams contested the Cornwall/Devon league, eight from Devon and six from Cornwall. Nine of the sides played in the league last season and were joined by two relegated from Western Counties West, two promoted from Devon 1 and one promoted from Cornwall 1. The relegated teams were Penryn (13th place) and Saltash (14th) and the incoming teams are Tamar Saracens and Topsham (both from Devon 1) and Lanner (Cornwall 1). The season started on 3 September 2016 and ended on 22 April 2017.

Falmouth won the league for the first time and along with the runner-up, Paignton are promoted to Western Counties West. The bottom three teams are relegated; Bodmin to Cornwall 1 and Topsham and Tamar Saracens to Devon 1.

Participating teams and locations

Final league table

2015–16

Participating teams and locations 
A total of fourteen teams contested the Cornwall/Devon league, seven each from Cornwall and Devon. Nine of the sides played in the league last season and were joined by two relegated from Western Counties West, two promoted from Devon 1 and one promoted from Cornwall 1. The relegated teams are Tavistock (13th place) and St Ives (14th), and the incoming teams are Plymouth Argaum and Plymstock Albion Oaks (both from Devon 1) and Newquay Hornets (Cornwall 1). The season started on 5 September 2015 and ended on 30 April 2016 with three matches still to play; the RFU deciding that the matches need not be played.

Bude, won the league for the first time and along with the runner-up, St Ives are promoted to Western Counties West. The bottom three teams are relegated; Newquay Hornets and Hayle to Cornwall 1 and Exeter Saracens to Devon 1.

Final league table

2014–15

Participating teams and locations 
The 2014–15 Cornwall/Devon League consisted of fourteen teams; seven from Cornwall and seven from Devon. The season started on 6 September 2014 and the final matches were played on 18 April 2015. Crediton beat the runner-up Saltash on the final day of the season to claim first place and both teams were promoted to Western Counties West. The bottom three teams were relegated; Old Plymothian & Mannamedian and South Molton to Devon 1, and Liskeard-Looe to Cornwall 1.

Final league table

2013–14

Exeter University, the champions, lost only one match and finished in their highest ever league placing. Tiverton came second and both teams were promoted to Western Counties West for 2014–15 season. Newquay Hornets, and Veor who won only two matches and promoted the previous season, are both relegated to Cornwall 1.

2012–13
In 2012–13 the Cornwall/Devon League consisted of thirteen teams; seven from Cornwall and six from Devon. The season started on 8 September 2012 and ended on 20 April 2013. Plymouth Barbarians were originally included in the fixtures but dropped out of the league during the season.

2011–12

2010–11

2009–10

Table

1989–90

Table

1988–89

1987–88

Original teams
When league rugby began in 1987 this division contained the following teams:

Bideford
Crediton
Exmouth
Falmouth
Hayle
Newton Abbot
Paignton
Penryn
Penzance & Newlyn
St Austell
Teignmouth

Cornwall/Devon honours

Cornwall/Devon League (1987–1993)
The original Cornwall/Devon League (sponsored by Courage) was a tier 8 league with promotion up to Western Counties and relegation down to either Cornwall 1 or Devon 1.

Cornwall/Devon League (1993–96)
The creation of National 5 South for the 1993–94 season meant that the Cornwall/Devon League dropped to a tier 9 league. Promotion continued to Western Counties and relegation to either Cornwall 1 or Devon 1. The league continued to be sponsored by Courage.

Cornwall/Devon League (1996–2009)
The cancellation of National 5 South at the end of the 1995–96 season saw the Cornwall/Devon League return to being a tier 8 division. Further restructuring meant that promotion was now to Western Counties West (formerly Western Counties) while relegation continued to either Cornwall 1 or Devon 1. From the 2008–09 season onward the league sponsor would be Tribute.

Cornwall/Devon League (2009–2022)
Despite widespread league restructuring by the RFU, the Cornwall/Devon League continued as a tier 8 division, with promotion to Western Counties West and relegation to either Cornwall 1 or Devon 1. Tribute continued to sponsor the league.

Summary of champions and runners-up

Sponsorship
The Cornwall/Devon League was part of the Courage Clubs Championship and sponsored by Courage Brewery from the first season, 1987–88 to season 1996–97. The league was unsponsored until season 2007–08 when St Austell Brewery sponsored South-west based leagues under the Tribute Ale label.

Notes

See also
 South West Division RFU
 Cornwall RFU
 Devon RFU
 English rugby union system
 Rugby union in Cornwall
 Rugby union in England

References

External links
 Trelawny's Army (league tables and results)

 
Defunct rugby union leagues in England
2
Rugby union in Devon
Rugby union in Somerset
Sports leagues established in 1987
Sports leagues disestablished in 2022